Kisiizi Power Station is a  hydroelectric power station in Uganda.

Location
The power station is located at the site of Kisiizi Waterfall, in the town of Kisiizi, Rukungiri District, in Western Uganda.

Overview
Kisiizi Power Station is the property of Kisiizi Power Company Limited, a wholly owned subsidiary of Kisiizi Hospital, a private, missionary hospital administered by the Church of Uganda, and is supported by an NGO based in the United Kingdom, known as Friends of Kisiizi. The current power station with capacity of 294 kW (0.3MW) was commissioned in 2008. It replaced an older power plant with a maximum capacity of only 60 kW (0.06MW). The power from the station is used by the hospital and its affiliated institutions. The surplus is sold to the greater Kisiizi community, including businesses and private homes.

See also

List of power stations in Uganda
List of hydropower stations in Africa

References

External links
Location of Kisiizi at Google Maps
http://www.kisiizihospital.org.ug/?page_id=89
http://www.kisiizihospital.org.ug/

Energy infrastructure completed in 2008
Hydroelectric power stations in Uganda
Rukungiri District